The Baudette–Rainy River Border Crossing connects the cities of Baudette, Minnesota and Rainy River, Ontario at the Baudette–Rainy River International Bridge.  The Port of Entry was established in 1960 when the International Bridge was completed.  Prior to 1960, the cities were connected via point-to-point ferry service as well as a railroad bridge.

Both the US and Canada border stations are open 24 hours per day.  The Canada border station at Rainy River was rebuilt in 1991, and features a tall canopy that accommodates larger trucks than those that can fit beneath the bridge structure (14' 8"). The height limitations restrict the size of the trucks than can cross the border at this location.  A replacement bridge was completed and opened to traffic in October 2020.

The US border station at Baudette was rebuilt in 1997.

See also
 List of Canada–United States border crossings

References 

Canada–United States border crossings
1960 establishments in Minnesota
1960 establishments in Ontario
Buildings and structures in Lake of the Woods County, Minnesota
Rainy River District